Dirt Eaters may refer to:

 The Dirt Eaters (EP), an EP by His Name Is Alive
 A novel in The Longlight Legacy by Dennis Foon